Yangon Region
Hmawbi Township is a township  in the Yangon Region of Myanmar (Burma). It is located northwest of the city of Yangon. The principal town and administrative seat is Hmawbi.

Technological University, Hmawbi exists near Hmawbi Township. Hmawbi is also home to the Aung Zabu Monastery.

Hmawbi Township is home to the Myaung Dagar Industrial Zone, which is a  zone constructed in 2006-2008 and is intended to house all of Yangon's steel factories. Operating licenses for steel smelters that do not relocate to the Industrial Zone are not renewed.

Borders
The Hlaing River forms the western border of Hmawbi Township, which borders on:
Taikkyi Township to the north;
Hlegu Township to the east;
Mingaladon Township to the southeast;
Shwepyitha Township to the south; and
Htantabin Township to the southwest, west and northwest.

Climate

Notes

External links

 "Hmawbi Township, Yangon Division" map ID: MIMU154 Hmawbi Township 090227 v01, February 2009, Myanmar Information Management Unit (MIMU) 

Townships of Yangon Region